Daniella Weiss (born August 30, 1945) is an Israeli Orthodox settlement movement activist, and a former mayor of Kedumim, an Israeli settlement located in the West Bank. She was first elected mayor of Kedumim in September 1996, and was re-elected for a second term in November 2001.

Biography
Daniella Weiss was born in Bnei Brak in 1945. Her parents, Jewish immigrants from the United States, were members of Lehi and took part in underground activities. She attended a religious high school in Ramat Gan, and studied as part of the Atuda program. She studied English literature and political science at Bar-Ilan University.

Since the 1970s, Weiss has been a notable figure in the Gush Emunim settlement movement, active in the establishment of many new communities in the Shomron.

In May 1987, she was arrested and convicted with respect to rioting by Israeli settlers in the city of Qalqiliya. She was sentenced to a fine and a suspended sentence.

In June 2007, she was charged with obstructing a police officer in the line of duty and assaulting a police officer. She was sentenced to 5 months probation. 

On October 3, 2008, she was arrested and charged with assaulting a police officer, interfering with a police investigation, and hindering a police officer in the performance of his duty. She was released from house arrest pending trial on October 6, 2008.

She was arrested, and promptly released, in December 2008 in Hebron.

In May 2009, Weiss was arrested with respect to assaulting a police officer and obstruction of an investigation. She was sentenced to two days under house arrest.

Daniella Weiss rejects the Price tag policy, saying that it had diverted settlers from what she considered to be their most important task - setting up additional caravans and tents to lay claim to ever more hilltops in the Shomron. She has stated that the only "price tag" action acceptable to her is the establishment of a new outpost in response to every outpost that had been demolished by Israeli authorities.

References

See also
Stone Cold Justice, by John Lyons,  for Australian Broadcasting Corporation

1945 births
20th-century Israeli women politicians
Israeli activists
Israeli women activists
Israeli Orthodox Jews
Israeli settlers
Living people
Women mayors of places in Israel
21st-century Israeli women politicians
Jewish women activists
Bar-Ilan University alumni
People from Bnei Brak